Karen K. Goh (born 1955) is an American politician and non-profit organization executive born in India. Goh is the 26th and current mayor of Bakersfield, California. Before becoming mayor of Bakersfield, Goh was a non profit executive at Garden Pathways which aided in provided aid to families in need. Goh is Bakersfield's first mayor of Asian descent. Goh defeated her opponent Kyle Carter with 52.75% of the votes. Goh was elected into office during November 2016, and was re-elected to an additional four-year term in March 2020, operating under a council manager form of government.

Goh is Bakersfield's first minority mayor and second woman to hold the position (after Mary K. Shell)

Mayor Goh continues her work by working on the boards of the Rotary Club of Bakersfield, Bakersfield Arts District Foundation, and Kern Leadership Alliance. Working as an advisor for the Bakersfield Safe Streets Partnership

Early life and education 
Goh was born to missionary parents Harry and Kathleen that came to British Colonial India. Goh has a brother, David Goh. In June 1962, at seven years old, Goh and her family moved to Bakersfield, California. Goh's parent provided ministry leadership for the Bakersfield Chinese Church, where Goh's older brother, David, currently works as a senior pastor. Goh's family founded Garden Community Church in Bakersfield, California.

In 1978, Goh earned a Bachelor of Music degree in Music Education from USC. In 1981, Goh completed all courses in Master of Music Education from USC. During university, Goh showed passion in playing the clarinet, and directed her efforts on music education. In 1991, after graduating, Goh found a position with The McGraw-Hill Companies in New York City. At age 12, Goh became a naturalized American citizen. Goh graduated from Bakersfield High School.

Early career

Music instructor 

Goh was a music instructor at Bakersfield Christian Life Schools and then moved to New York City to work at the McGraw-Hill Companies in 1989. She was promoted from Executive Editor to editorial director during her seven years working with the company.

Administrator/Vice president (1989-2002) 

In 1996, Goh moved from an instructor towards managing editor of The McGraw-Hill Companies in New York, and was then promoted as the Vice president of the publishing operations. The company was responsible for printed and technological planning, allocating resources for educational development. Under this position, Goh was responsible for managing administrative operations such as trademarks, finances, human resources, and any facilities for the company. Goh worked as the vice president for two years from 2002 to 2004 for the McGraw Hill Company. Goh worked for the McGraw-Hill company for eight years, ending her position with the company in 2004.

Executive director (2005-2010) 

After returning to Bakersfield in 2005, Goh volunteered at Garden Pathways for five years. The operation was a non profit that focused on providing tutoring, training and guidance for children, adult youth and adults alike. The company also focused on gathering resources for childhood education, emancipated foster children, pregnant youth, and families impacted by gang violence. During her years in Garden Pathways, Goh was charged as the executive director and worked on projects in collaboration with  UNICEF.  The program for at risk youth focused on developing opportunities in the arts for the children it was aiding. While Goh also moved on to other companies, in 2013, Goh became the President and CEO of Garden Pathways, in Bakersfield.

County supervisor (2010-2013) 

On December 10, 2010, Goh became the fifth district supervisor of Kern County in Bakersfield she was appointed by the former governor, Arnold Schwarzenegger. In her position, Goh became a member of the Board of supervisors, which was in charge of the executive and legislative matters involving Kern Country and its special districts. She was also responsible for adopting an annual Kern County budget of $2.5 billion. There was controversy in her appointment considering Goh's lack of political background, however Goh solidified her position by remaining loyal to the citizens of Kern County.

2016 mayoral campaign 
On February 18, 2016, Karen Goh announced an interest in considering running for mayor. After former Bakersfield mayor Harvey L. Hall issued a statement that he would not be running for a fifth term for the ceremonial mayoral position. On February 25, 2016, the number of mayoral candidates for Bakersfield grew to reach 25; the busiest race in Bakersfield since 2000. Goh was against four other female candidates, a phenomenon unseen in sixteen years.

Karen Goh announced her formal candidacy on February 29, 2016. Kyle Carter and Karen Goh faced off for the 2016 mayoral runoff in November of that year. Goh pulled ahead with 33.31% of the votes (18,825) against Carter with 32.54% of the votes (18,389). Proceeding the runoff, Goh raised nearly $23,000 through contributions from fundraisers and donors such as Bakersfield and Kent residents.

On August 30, Goh made an appearance at Bakersfield High School to students to introduce herself and her campaign. Commenting on her multiple appearances and events as another part of her collaborative efforts. Defining the work as mayor to help to foster opportunities and a work-friendly environment for others. When commenting on what she would accomplish in her role as mayor, she mentions creating more job opportunities, fostering a safe community, and implementing education programs for the youth of Bakersfield.

Karen Goh received the public endorsement from Bakersfield Chamber's PAC on November 7, 2016. There was criticism of the action considering Goh served on the board, the action seeming to be influenced by Goh's presence. However, the Chamber clarified that it was an independent entity from the board and is not influenced by outside forces. As the PAC is funded by members and the Chamber is a membership organization, the Chamber PAC claimed this served to validate the endorsement of Goh for mayor.

On November 8, 2016, at age 60, Goh won the runoff election and became the 26th mayor of Bakersfield, California. Goh defeated Kyle Carter with 52.75% of the votes. Goh became the first mayor of Asian descent and second woman mayor in Bakersfield, California.

On January 4, 2017, Karen Goh was sworn in as the 26th mayor of Bakersfield. Goh's sworn in ceremony was attended by Mary Shell, the first woman mayor of Bakersfield. Goh acknowledged her goal as mayor was to bring people from diverse backgrounds together to create a united front for the future of the city. Goh welcomed advice, comments, ideas for all and that she is open to listen and adapt.

The mayoral position within Bakersfield has symbolic power in the eyes of the public, as the mayor can only vote in the event of a tie within council meetings. The mayoral duties of Bakersfield are to promote the economic and industrial sector within the base of  the city. Serving as the official representative of Bakersfield at state functions. Goh holds the position of attending multiple ribbon cuttings, meetings, and working nonstop.

2019 mayoral campaign 

Karen Goh sought out reelection for a second term. Goh stated her intentions are to once more embrace the community and to encourage new businesses and opportunities.

On December 10, 2019, two other candidates decided to run against Goh. The second candidate was Greg Tatum, being the 60-year-old pastor of Change Community Church, claiming his intentions for running are to attempt to change the mindset of the community in deprived areas. Claiming his focus will be on battling homelessness, drug use, and sexually transmitted diseases. Tatum had attempted to run for mayor in 2016, finishing sixth out of the 25 candidates. In 2018, Tatum was also defeated in the top two primary for the state Senate District Race.

The third candidate was Joseph Caporali, the 88-year-old CEO of Caporali Productions. Caporali had previously run for mayor in 2008 against Harvey Hill. Caporali stated that he will work for the people within the community. There was a fourth candidate, Mark Hudson who had filed to run for office, but had not met the qualifying standards. He became a write-in candidate, his name not appearing on the ballot. He previously owned many janitorial, car washing, and window washing businesses. As a candidate, he claimed to want to give Bakersfield voters more impact in city issues.

On February 12, 2020, Goh received the endorsement from the Bakersfield Californian, the city newspaper. The Bakersfield Californian justified their endorsement not only on the lack of qualifications of the oppositions, but also the leadership Goh had shown during her first term. The newspaper claimed that Goh had led multiple efforts to tackle the homeless crisis, and worked hard towards a common goal within the city. The Bakersfield Californian claimed that Bakersfield voters should cast their ballots for Karen Goh as mayor for a second term.

March 3, 2020, was election day for both the president of the United States, along with mayor of Bakersfield. California has a "jungle primary" system, in which the top two candidates in a race will advance in November. However, this did not apply for the Bakersfield mayor race, as any candidate that gets more than 50 percent of the vote will win.

March 4, 2020 solidified Karen Goh's position as mayor once again. Goh won 83.6 percent of the vote according to the Kern County Elections Department. Tatum won 10 percent of the vote, and Caporali won 6 percent.

On January 6, 2021, Goh was formally sworn into office once again, serving until 2025.

Goh has stated that in her second term, she hopes to focus on action and powerful systemic change within the city's homeless population.

Political positions

Environment 
The Bakersfield city council, and mayor Karen Goh are in favor of environmentally friendly policies. Bakersfield has a “climate goal” and wishes to reduce money and pollution coming from Bakersfield's energy usage.

Goh is an active member on the Keep Bakersfield Beautiful board, which works to clean up litter throughout the city and tracks the litter levels. Goh responded to the increase in litter levels by collaborating with Golden Empire Transit to place more garbage bins around bus stations. Goh emphasized the importance of the appearance of Bakersfield to reflect the community and its people.

Goh was a part of the decision to have  solar panels installed across the city of Bakersfield, as well as the building of the energy innovation center. These were both enacted in hopes of having a more environmentally friendly way of energy consumption, and as a way to save taxpayers money. This was one of the main points that Goh spoke on at the event of introducing the solar panels. Goh let the members of Bakersfield know that this would be saving them money as taxpayers. The energy innovation center was possible through $83 million in state funding.

Policing 

Goh's decisions regarding police are based on the goal of increasing public safety. In the summer of 2020, members of Bakersfield were protesting for the police to be defunded, as police brutality was becoming an issue .Goh, and the other 7 members of the city council have the police a 119.9 million dollar budget anyways despite what the protestors of Bakersfield were asking for. This creates 44 new jobs at the Bakersfield police station and 97 jobs in other public safety related fields. The costly budget was intended to increase public safety. Goh did address the concerns of community members however, and agreed to review police policies. Following the murder of George Floyd, community members were very concerned about racially motivated police brutality and Goh recognized this issue and responded to it. She decided to review police policies and communicate with the people of Bakersfield what these changing policies would entail.

Goh has made statements on wanting to better relationships between the police force and the citizens of Bakersfield. Doing so by emphasizing the importance of the presence of police officers, who are in charge of keeping neighborhoods safe. Goh has publicly attending events such as Kids and Cops, which worked on partnering officers with children to play games and form positive connects with officers.

Homelessness 

Goh has made multiple statements to tackle homeless issues throughout the city. Supporting the proposition of creating homeless shelters within the city. Collaborating with Bakersfield supervisors and other leaders to form a strategy to address the issues. Goh has also made the public statement that handouts are not an effective strategy in which to address the homeless crisis within Bakersfield. Claiming that in the long term, money aids in enabling substance abuse and encourages begging. The best alternative would be donating to nonprofit organizations that work more intimately with the homeless population. Karen Goh has worked with the Kern Community Foundation to be able to tackle the issue.

On April 18, 2018, Goh was one of the 11 Californian mayors who traveled to Sacramento to advocate for more state funding to be directed to fight and address homelessness. The press conference was to support Assembly Bill 3171, which would allow $1.5 billion tp local governments to be able to aid their homeless population. There was a 9% increase in homelessness within Bakersfield in 2018, the total population of homeless people being 885. And the number of unsheltered homeless people had grown to 46%. Goh has stated that creating more shelters should be the top priority.

On August 20, 2018, the nonprofit organization Garden Pathways announced to being open to getting involved at the homelessness crisis within Bakersfield. Goh being the head of the organization, announced the focus of the program to studying homelessness and that forces that drive it. Garden Pathways partnered with Dignity Health, which will provide $100,000 to the cause.

On October 1, 2018, it was announced that Kern County would receive $3.8 million in funds from the state to combat homelessness. The funds are attributed partly to the advocacy from Karen Goh and other mayor's. In addition to this, Bakersfield also received $1.2 million in HEAP funding from the state.

Within Bakersfield dealings with the homeless crisis, Goh has advocated for state resources to be put to use and in effect.

On November 22, 2022, Goh submitted an action plan for state homelessness funds. Goh stated that the state would need to prioritize investments on homelessness towards early intervention and housing. Goh also stated that despite her leading housing production, Bakersfield is not able to provide mental health and substance abuse aid. Goh stated that as cities continue to expand their shelters, there is also an increase in service resistance.

Education 

Karen Goh has made it her goal to prioritize education for the children of Kern county. Goh was at the groundbreaking ceremony of the construction of the new East Bakersfield elementary school. Claiming it is the collective efforts of everyone involved in the district to make the school successful.

Goh has made multiple appearances at local high schools for varying events. Goh attended the Kern High School Districts' PEAAK Awards, presenting the Mayors trophy to a senior for their academic performance, leadership and community service.

On May 6, 2022. Goh had announced a $5.4 million youth employment program, offering young people the opportunities to lead in community service and their labor would bring city and nonprofit involvement. With this programs, jobs would be given to young people who are at risk and involved in the juvenile justice system. This was made in the hopes to be assist at risk youth.

COVID-19 response 

On March 31, 2020, along with other local leaders, Karen Goh assured the residents of Bakersfield that local authorities are ready for COVID-19 effects. Stating that public health, local health officials, and local health providers are all well prepared and ready. Goh urged residents and businesses to follow suit, by following social distances procedures, washing hands, and remaining on lockdown. Goh has stated that she endorses the mask mandate and encourages all residents to do the same and follow social distancing guidelines. Goh has also stated her appreciation for all healthcare workers as COVID cases rise throughout the country.

On September 18, 2020, Goh had released a video to Bakersfield residents to rally together to attempt reopening. Goh had advised residents to put politics aside and instead called on the community to reach state metrics needed to begin to reopen schools, gyms, and other businesses. To do this, residents would need to continue to respect social distancing guidelines and mask mandates.

On February 2, 2021, Goh signed a letter which encouraged the state of California to approve COVID-19 vaccinations for TK through second grade students and educators.

Housing 

The city of Bakersfield and Goh also work towards preventing homelessness with their housing policies and programs. They have implemented an Affordable Housing program which provides funds for developing housing for low income families, as well as the HOME-ARP (American Rescue Plan) program which also provided funding to give those who experience homelessness, or the vulnerable, a home or shelter. This act of 2021 had gathered up to $5 billion to provide these services.

Transportation 

The city of Bakersfield has done many things to make transportation easier as well as promote more active ways of transport. They promoted biking by building a bicycle transportation network that connects throughout the city so that bicyclists can explore new parts of the city. They also have lots of events to encourage and promote biking, such as bike to work day or the Sunday city bike ride. They also designed the Thomas Roads Improvement Program (TRIP) to improve outdated infrastructure and create less travel time throughout the city. TRIP has completed many different projects which have either provided widening of roads, interchanges, or new parkways, all to make transportation easier.

Charity work 

Goh had an extensive history of charity and nonprofit work before focusing on mayoral work. Goh has remarked a duty to give back to the residents of her community and to be able to contribute in any way possible. Every year since 2012 Goh has generated 204,477 pounds of food for the citizens of Kern county. On March 23, 2017, Hoh was honored top humanitarian and volunteer of the year by the Kern Country Fair board of trustees.

Karen Goh hosted a Mayors ball on February 8, 2020. The event was a fundraising gala to which Goh had lent her name was in collaborating with CityServe, a non profit organization that works with people in crisis. The event served to join black tie outfits and dining with the cause of assisting families in need and are experiencing extreme hardships. The gala was seen a prototype, as communities continue to grapple with their at need status, organizations are attempting to find ways to assist families.

Personal life 
Goh attributed witnessing the 9/11 terrorist attacks to her transition from non-profit work to local government. It was while working at MacMillian-McGraw Hill that Goh witnessed the attacks from her office window. As an executive, Goh recalled feeling responsible for the safety of her colleagues, the fear and uncertainty of the next steps to take left Goh in confusion. In the following years, Goh would work to give back to her community, and the impact of witnessing the attacks changed her perspective. Goh recalled that her original goal of rising the corporate ladder was no longer her focus, attributing her decision to leave the McGraw Hill company a few years later. In March 2004, Goh's mother died in Bakersfield. In 2005, Goh moved from the East Coast back to Bakersfield. Goh is unmarried.

Awards 
 League of Women Voters of Kern County "2013 Carrie Catt Award" for outstanding community service.
 2014 Women Inspiring Girls Award. Presented by Girl Scouts for exemplary achievement in the community and as a role model for girls.
 Kern Council of Governments "2014 Darrel Hildebrand Distinguished Leadership Award"
 Kern County Hispanic Chamber of Commerce "2014 Community Service Award"
 2015 California Woman of Excellence. Presented by Distinguished Young Women of California.
 2015 International Women's Day Award. Presented by International Women's Day Inc.
 2016 Wendy Wayne Award. Presented by Cal State Bakersfield/Kegley Institute of Ethics.
 Community Action Partnership of Kern "2017 Humanitarian of the Year"

See also 
 2016 Bakersfield, California mayoral election
 List of Mayors of Bakersfield

References

External links 
Karen Goh at ballotpedia.org
Karen Goh at gardenpathways.org
Karen Goh at kvpr.org (October20, 2016)
New controversy strikes Goh campaign (May 17, 2012)
 Karen Goh at bakersfieldsistercity.org

1956 births
California politicians of Chinese descent
California Republicans
County supervisors in California
Living people
Mayors of places in California
Naturalized citizens of the United States
People from Bakersfield, California
21st-century American women
Asian conservatism in the United States